Noah Anthony Miller (born November 12, 2002) is an American baseball shortstop for the Minnesota Twins organization. He was selected by the Twins of Major League Baseball (MLB) in the 2021 Major League Baseball draft.

Early life 
Miller was born on November 12, 2002, in Fredonia, Wisconsin. As a senior at Ozaukee High School in Ozaukee County, Wisconsin, Miller batted .608, with six home runs and 21 runs batted in (RBIs), as well as 14 stolen bases and 41 runs scored. The Wisconsin Baseball Coaches Association named Miller the Division 3 player of the year for his performance. At the end of his high school career, Perfect Game named Miller the top prospect in the state of Wisconsin, the No. 13 shortstop prospect in the nation, and the No. 49 overall prospect.

Career 
The Minnesota Twins of Major League Baseball (MLB) selected Miller 36th overall in the 2021 MLB Draft. He was part of the first competitive balance round in that year's draft, placed between the first and second regular draft rounds. The Twins had considered Miller a "strong candidate" for the 26th overall draft selection, which they ultimately used on pitcher Chase Petty, and were keen on selecting him 10 places later. At the time he was drafted, Miller had committed to play college baseball for the University of Alabama. Miller signed with Minnesota on July 22, 2021, for a bonus of $2,045,400. He made his professional baseball debut for the Rookie-level Florida Complex League Twins on August 16, going 1-for-3 with a line drive single. In 22 FCL games and 84 at bats, Miller batted .238 with two home runs and 14 RBIs.

Miller began the 2022 season with the Twins' Single-A affiliate, the Fort Myers Mighty Mussels of the Florida State League.

Personal life 
Miller is the younger brother of Owen Miller, an infielder for the Milwaukee Brewers.

References

External links
 

Living people
2002 births
People from Fredonia, Wisconsin
Baseball shortstops
Baseball players from Wisconsin